Jennifer Nitsch (Cologne, December 10, 1966 – Munich, June 13, 2004) was a German television actress.

Selected filmography
 1989: , as Silke
 1991: , as Anette
 1993: Gefährliche Verbindung (TV film), as Regine
 1994: Nur eine kleine Affäre (TV miniseries), as Teresa Gärtner
 1995-1996: Die Straßen von Berlin (TV series, 6 episodes), as Irene Starnow
 1996:  (TV miniseries), as Barbara Sattler
 1997: Life Penalty (TV film), as Katja
 1998:  (TV film), as Marianna
 1998: Women Don't Lie, as Marie
 1998:  (TV miniseries), as Isabella
 1999: Chain of Evidence (TV film), as Lisa
 2000: Death, Deceit and Destiny Aboard the Orient Express, as Rita Evans
 2004: Pact with the Devil, as Bae

External links

 

1966 births
German television actresses
20th-century German actresses
21st-century German actresses
2004 deaths
Suicides by jumping in Germany
2004 suicides